Jui Gadkari is an Indian actress who mainly works in Marathi language television  She is known for her show Pudhcha Paaul and being contestant of Bigg Boss Marathi 1.

Early life
Gadkari was born on 8 July 1998 in Mumbai, Maharashtra. Her father was play writer and rhythmist. She had confirmed that she suffered from Prolactinoma and Rheumatoid arthritis.

Career
Gadkari started her career as Assistant director in white paper communications. She debut with the show Shrimant Peshwa Bajirao Mastani in the year 2009 where she played the role of Chanda. After that show, she appeared in Maziya Priyala Preet Kalena and Tujvin Sakhya Re. 

In the year 2011, she portrayed role of Kalyani Sardeshmukh in Star Pravah's Pudhcha Paaul which was ended in 2017. In 2017, she appeared in Colors Marathi's Saraswati as Devika. In 2018, she had participated in Marathi reality show Bigg Boss Marathi 1 as a contestant where she evicted on Day 49. After that show, She played a lead role in Vartul. 

In 2020, she has appeared in Sony Marathi's Singing Star as a contestant. Currently, she bagged a lead role in Star Pravah's Tharla Tar Mag as Sayali.

Personal life 
Jui is in a long term relationship with her Pudhcha Paaul co-actor Prasad Limaye since 2011.

Television

References

External links 

 Jui Gadkari on IMDb

Indian television actresses
21st-century Indian actresses
1988 births
Living people
Bigg Boss Marathi contestants
Actresses from Mumbai
Actresses in Marathi television